Elections were held in South Korea on 8 August 1956 for city, town and township mayors and councilors and on 13 August 1956 for special city and provincial councilors. A total of six city mayors, 30 town mayors, 544 township mayors, 416 city councilors, 990 town councilors, 15,548 township councilors, 47 special city councilors, and 390 provincial councilors were elected.

City, town and township elections 
Elections for city, town and township mayors and councilors were held on 8 August 1956.

Mayoral elections

Summary

City mayoral elections by region

Town mayoral elections by region

Township mayoral elections by region

Council elections

Special city and provincial elections 
Elections for special city and provincial councilors were held on 13 August 1956.

Summary

By region

References 

1956 elections in South Korea
1956